Gauribidanur Assembly constituency is one of the 224 constituencies in the Karnataka Legislative Assembly of Karnataka a south state of India. It is also part of Chikballapur Lok Sabha constituency.

Members of Legislative Assembly

Mysore State
 1951: K. H. Venkata Reddy, Independent

 1957: K. H. Venkata Reddy, Independent

 1962: R. N. Lakshmipathi, Independent

 1967: R. N. Lakshmipathi, Independent

 1972: V. Krishna Rao, Indian National Congress

Karnataka State
 1978: B. N. K. Papaiah, Indian National Congress (Indira)

 1983: R. N. Lakshmipathi, Janata Party

 1985: Chandrasekhar, Janata Party

 1989: S.V. Aswathanarayana Reddy, Indian National Congress

 1994: N. Jyothi Reddy, Janata Dal

 1999: N. H. Shivashankara Reddy, Independent

 2004: N. H. Shivashankara Reddy, Indian National Congress

 2008: N. H. Shivashankara Reddy, Indian National Congress

 2013: N. H. Shivashankara Reddy, Indian National Congress

See also
 Chikballapur district
 List of constituencies of Karnataka Legislative Assembly

References

Assembly constituencies of Karnataka
Chikkaballapur district